The Turbomeca Makila is a family of French turboshaft engines for helicopter use, first run in 1976 and flown in 1977.

Typical power output is around 1,300 kW (1,700 hp). , some 2,200 had been built.

Applications
 Puma HC Mk 2
 Aérospatiale Super Puma
 Denel Oryx
 Denel Rooivalk
 Eurocopter AS532 Cougar
 Eurocopter EC225 Super Puma
 Eurocopter EC725
 IAR 330 SM
 Turboliner

Variants

Makila 1A  1240 kW (1662shp)
Makila 1A1 1357 kW (1819shp)
Makila 1A2 1376 kW (1845shp)
Makila 1A4

Makila 2A  1801 kW (2415shp)
Makila 2A1

Makila 2B

Specifications (Makila 2A)

See also

References

Notes

Bibliography

 

Makila
1970s turboshaft engines